The 1934 United States Senate election in Vermont took place on November 6, 1934. Incumbent Republican Warren Austin successfully ran for re-election to a full term in the United States Senate, defeating Democratic candidate Fred C. Martin. Austin was elected in a 1931 special election to replace Frank C. Partridge, who was appointed to fill the vacancy created by the death of Frank L. Greene. As of 2022, Martin's 48.37% vote share remains the largest a Democrat has ever received for Vermont's Class I Senate seat.

Republican primary

Candidates
Harry B. Amey, former United States Attorney for the District of Vermont and State Senator from Island Pond
Warren Austin, incumbent Senator since 1931

Campaign
Senator Austin undertook an extensive advertising and letter-writing campaign but did not directly address his opponent, who was not considered a strong threat.

Results

Democratic primary

Candidates
Fred C. Martin, Collector of Internal Revenue for Vermont and nominee for Senate in 1928

Results

General election

Results

References

Bibliography

Vermont
1934
1934 Vermont elections